The women's 400 metres event at the 1966 European Indoor Games was held on 27 March in Dortmund.

Medalists

Results

Heats
The first 2 from each heat (Q) qualified directly for the final.

Final

References

400 metres at the European Athletics Indoor Championships
400